Avaré is a city in the State of São Paulo, Brazil, located 270 km from the state capital, São Paulo. The population is 91,232 (2020 est.) in an area of 1213 km2. Established on 15 September 1861 by Major Vitoriano de Souza Rocha and Domiciano Santana, the city was developed around the chapel of Our Lady of the Good Death ("Nossa Senhora da Boa Morte").

The economy is based on agriculture, cattle ranching and tourism. The Jurumirim Hydroelectric Dam in the Paranapanema River is situated near Avaré. The city has its own airport, Avaré-Arandu Airport.

Tourism is an important aspect in Avaré, which today is virtually a large ranch. Traditional events occur throughout the year, such as the Feira das Nações (Fair of the Nations), where typical foods of various countries are served, and the FAMPOP, (Fair of Popular Music), whose objective is to highlight and award singers, musicians and composers. Natural attractions such as Terra da Água, do Verde e do Sol ("Land of water, the green, and the sun") also invite tourists to the beauty of Avaré's large reservoir.

The city is also distinguished as a center of higher education.  Many students from the surrounding region come to Avaré seeking a quality education and a chance to study. The Faculdade Sudoeste Paulista (São Paulo State Southwest College) and other higher education institutions are located there.

Gallery

References

External links

 Photos of the City
   Association Industrial Commercial Farming of Avaré – ACIA
  EncontraAvaré - Find everything about Avaré

Municipalities in São Paulo (state)
Populated places established in 1861
1861 establishments in Brazil